The 2019 Cherwell District Council election was held on 2 May 2019 to elect members of Cherwell District Council in England. This was on the same day as other local elections.

Results summary

Ward results

Adderbury, Bloxham & Bodicote

Banbury Calthorpe & Easington

Banbury Cross & Neithrop

Banbury Grimsbury & Hightown

Banbury Hardwick

Banbury Ruscote

Bicester East

Bicester North & Caversfield

Bicester South & Ambrosden

Bicester West

Cropredy, Sibfords & Wroxton

Deddington

Fringford & Heyfords

Kidlington East

Kidlington West

Launton & Otmoor

References

2010s in Oxfordshire
2019
2019 English local elections